Gur Band (also Romanized as Gūr Band; also known as Garband Ribāt and Gorband-e Robāţ) is a village in Jamrud Rural District, in the Central District of Torbat-e Jam County, Razavi Khorasan Province, Iran. At the 2006 census, its population was 324, in 70 families.

References 

Populated places in Torbat-e Jam County